The Oath is a 2016 Icelandic thriller film written by Ólafur Egill Egilsson, and co-written and directed by Baltasar Kormákur, who also plays the leading role. It was screened in the Special Presentations section at the 2016 Toronto International Film Festival. It was the most popular movie in Icelandic theaters in 2016.

Plot
Finnur is a surgeon who is worried about his eldest daughter, Anna. Anna has been involved with drugs and Finnur is made aware that Anna's boyfriend Óttar is a drug dealer. Thinking he is a bad influence on Anna, Finnur tries to break up the relationship. But neither Anna nor Óttar has any intention in doing so and Óttar becomes threatening due to Finnur's incursions on their private life. After Finnur's workmate Halldór shows him a victim of a shooting, Finnur starts to plan for Óttar's disappearance.

Cast
Baltasar Kormákur as Finnur
Hera Hilmar as Anna
Gísli Örn Garðarsson as Óttar
Ingvar Eggert Sigurðsson as Halldór
Þorsteinn Bachmann as Ragnar

Reception
On review aggregator website Rotten Tomatoes, the film holds a 75% approval rating, based on 16 reviews with an average rating of 7/10.

Adam Graham of Detroit News had compared the film to Fear and Taken, and praised Kormákur for setting "[an] icy tone from the beginning".

Matthew Lickona of San Diego Reader jokingly have said that "[The Oath] is [a]n anti-Taken, though definitely not a Given", adding in his closing comments that "Everyone gets sympathy; no one gets excused".

Michael McNeely of That Shelf (formerly The Hindu Business Line), compared the film to Graduation and The Unknown Woman, but said that "unlike The Unknown Woman, the investigation is fast-paced and the results are found quickly".

Brent McKnight of Seattle Times had commented on film's "escalating psychological tension", adding that it "eschews the action trappings for delicate character work".

According to Laura DeMarco of The Plain Dealer, "[the film] is a philosophical drama that asks is it right for a father to go to such lengths".

Unlike other critics, Chicago Readers Ben Sachs found the film "ugly and misanthropic".

References

External links

2010s thriller films
Icelandic thriller films
Films directed by Baltasar Kormákur
Films scored by Hildur Guðnadóttir
2010s Icelandic-language films